Jon Peter Rolie (18 December 1945 – 22 November 2020) was a Norwegian novelist.

He made his literary debut in 1977 with the novel Seljesonate. Among his other novels are Mannen som ville finne tidens kilde from 1987, and Livets fest from 1991.

He was awarded Mads Wiel Nygaards Endowment in 1987.

Rolie died in November 2020.

References

1945 births
2020 deaths
20th-century Norwegian novelists